Koaburaside is an anti-histamine compound isolated from Lindera obtusiloba.

External links 
 Phenolic glycosides from Lindera obtusiloba and their anti-allergic inflammatory activities

Phenol glucosides
O-methylated natural phenols
Lindera